Joseph Dindiok Kpemka is a Ghanaian politician and member of the Seventh Parliament of the Fourth Republic of Ghana representing the Tempane Constituency in the Upper East Region on the ticket of the New Patriotic Party.

Education 
He holds a Bachelor of Arts degree from the University of Ghana and an LLB from The Ghana School of Law.

Career 
He taught English at the Ghana Education Service from 2002 to 2005. From 2008 to 2009 he served as a District Chief Executive. He became a lawyer and lectured at the Bolgatanga Technical University from 2009 to 2016.

During the 2020 general election, he failed to retain his seat against the opposition, Miss Lydia Akanvariba Lamisi of National Democratic Congress (NDC). He polled 16,462 votes against 20,939 votes for the NDC candidate.

References

Ghanaian MPs 2017–2021
1973 births
Living people
New Patriotic Party politicians